Jannik Pohl (born 6 April 1996) is a Danish professional footballer who plays as a forward for Icelandic club Fram Reykjavík.

Club career

AaB
Pohl started his youth career in Hundelev and Vendsyssel FF (formerly FC Hjørring), and joined the AaB youth team in 2011 at the age of 15.

During the pre-season for 2015–16 Pohl, together with teammates Oliver Abildgaard, was promoted from the U-19 team to the senior team. Sports Director of AaB, Allan Gaarde publicly praised Pohl as a promising striker who most likely would get his breakthrough to the first team within his first season.

Pohl made his first team Danish Superliga debut on 1 April 2016 against FC Nordsjælland. and scored his first senior goal against Odense BK in the last round of the Danish Superliga 2015–16 season.

Groningen
Pohl joined FC Groningen on 29 August 2018. After playing only 8 games for the club in the 2018-19 season, he was loaned out on the transfer deadline day, 2 September 2019, to AC Horsens for the rest of 2019.

Horsens
On 30 January 2020, after returning from his loan deal, Groningen terminated his contract, meaning that he became a free agent. Horsens signed him on a permanent contract the same day. On 23 November 2021 Pohl confirmed, that he would leave Horsens at the end of the year, where his contract was expiring.

Fram Reykjavík
On 29 March 2022, Pohl joined Icelandic club Fram Reykjavík.

Career statistics

References

External links

Jannik Pohl at DBU
Jannik Pohl at Superstats.dk

1996 births
Living people
People from Hjørring
Association football forwards
Danish men's footballers
Denmark under-21 international footballers
Denmark youth international footballers
Danish expatriate men's footballers
AaB Fodbold players
FC Groningen players
AC Horsens players
Knattspyrnufélagið Fram players
Danish Superliga players
Eredivisie players
Expatriate footballers in the Netherlands
Expatriate footballers in Iceland
Danish expatriate sportspeople in the Netherlands
Danish expatriate sportspeople in Iceland
Sportspeople from the North Jutland Region